Cheyres-Châbles is a municipality in the district of Broye in the canton of Fribourg in Switzerland. On 1 January 2017 the former municipalities of Châbles and Cheyres merged into the new municipality of Cheyres-Châbles.

History

Cheyres
Cheyres is first mentioned in 1230 as Cheres.

Geography

Demographics

Historic Population
The historical population is given in the following chart:

Sights
The entire Font region (shared between Châbles and Font) is designated as part of the Inventory of Swiss Heritage Sites.

References

External links

 

Municipalities of the canton of Fribourg
Populated places on Lake Neuchâtel